Benito Vines (named Benet Vinyes in Catalan, his mother tongue; 1837–1893) was a Jesuit cleric at Belen Jesuit Preparatory School during the 19th century in Havana, Cuba.  He became well known for his studies of hurricanes.  He was the Director of the Magnetical and Meteorological Observatory of the Royal College of Belen in Havana, and the author of Practical Hints in Regard to the West Indian Hurricanes, a work which was translated into English by the US Navy and issued by the United States Hydrographic Office.

References

Jesuit scientists
1837 births
1893 deaths